Urdu Times is a free Urdu newspaper from New York. It was first published in 1980.  Over the years, Urdu Times extended the area of publication and is now being published in New York, Washington, D.C., Atlanta, Miami, Detroit, Chicago, Houston, Los Angeles, Mississauga (a suburb of Toronto), Montreal, London, Birmingham and Manchester.

Khalil-ur-Rehman is the chief editor of Urdu Times. In Canada the papers is headed by Mohammad Azam Gondal and Tahir Chaudhary in the United Kingdom.

In 1980, it was a 4-page newspaper. Since there was no internet or Pakistani channels and the telephone was very expensive, to get the news Khali-ur-Rahman used to pick up the latest copies of the Pakistani Urdu newspapers from the Pakistan International Airlines' staff that used to fly with the flight from Pakistan. Most of the pages were prepared by cutting and pasting the news from the old daily Pakistani papers while the latest few news were received by telephone the day before the publication. Also, since there were no computers, Mr. Rahman hired the lone Urdu 'Katib' (calligrapher) in New York city to write the headlines.

The process of publishing the paper went through several evolutionary steps and today 80% of the news editing and page making gets done in the Urdu Times office in Lahore Pakistan. The finalized pages are transmitted via Internet to various printing presses all over North America.

The Urdu Times has also organized international Urdu conferences in North America.

Notes

Further reading

External links
 
 Urdu News Channel

One Urdu times is also published in India from Mumbai since 1960 by Late Mohammad Nazeer and still it is very famous in Urdu speaking community.

Urdu-language newspapers published in the United States
Non-English-language newspapers published in New York (state)
Publications established in 1980
Newspapers published in New York City
1980 establishments in New York City